Ahmed Nimal is a Maldivian actor, director, editor, writer and producer.

Early life
Prior to acting in films, Nimal worked at Maldives Meteorological Service office. His interest in films and acting grew due to the influence of his colleagues including Easa Shareef and other friends who actively take part in theatre plays.

Career
Nimal made his career debut with Nufoozu (1984), an initiation by Shareef and his colleagues. Initially assigned to work behind the camera, Shareef requested him to star in the lead role of the film due to a date conflict of the original actor who was offered the role first. Afterwards, he started working as a full-time actor and led an organization "Dhivehi Harakaaiy Jamiyya" along with Shareef.

In 1993, Nimal wrote and directed his most successful release, a drama film, Sitee starring opposite his wife, Fathimath Rameeza. Based on true incidents which occurred with a friend, the film focuses on a fisherman who later turns to be a successful businessman and his search for his father. The film and the song "Mulhi Jaan Hithaa" are considered to be his most "dedicated work in his career" since the latter took a month to be filmed while shot in five different islands from five atolls.

In 2000, Nimal acted and directed year's most successful Maldivian film, a horror classic Zalzalaa (2000) featuring Niuma Mohamed, Ibrahim Wisan and Ali Shameel in pivotal roles. The film follows a man who lost his life and endangering his whole family while being lured by a female spirit sent off to complete an unfulfilled prophecy. The following year, he worked in Aishath Ali Manik's Hiiy Edhenee (2001) which was an unofficial remake of Dharmesh Darshan's romantic film Dhadkan (2000) starring Akshay Kumar, Suniel Shetty and Shilpa Shetty in the lead role. Cast opposite Ali Seezan and Sheela Najeeb, he played the role of an influential and cunning step-father. His next directorial venture was the film Sababu starred opposite Ibrahim Giyas and Aishath Shiranee where he played the fiancé who sacrificed his love for the sake of his friend's happiness.

In 2005, Nimal starred alongside Niuma Mohamed, Ali Seezan and Sheereen Abdul Wahid in his horror film Handhu Keytha (2005) which unfolds the story of a man who was enchanted by a spirit while witnessing a lunar eclipse. In the film, he played the 
spell-maker trying to save his crush from the evil spirit.

In April 2006, his revenge thriller film, Hiyani was released which featured him as the traitorous husband, whose life is turns to a mess due to his frauds. The film which primarily focuses on a wealthy troublesome couple whose possessions have been exposed by the disappearance of the husband, was mostly received positively by the critics. He next released a romantic film Vaaloabi Engeynama (2006), starring Yoosuf Shafeeu, Mariyam Afeefa, Fathimath Fareela and Fauziyya Hassan in pivotal roles, was a critical and commercial success, considered to be the most successful Maldivian release of the year. The film follows a conflicted husband struggling to convey equal affection towards his two spouses. His work in the film garnered him a Gaumee Film Award as the Best Director, simultaneously winning the Best Film Award.

His erotic horror thriller Khalaas was released in 2008 which follows a newly married couple who relocate themselves to Sri Lanka. Starring alongside Ali Seezan, Mariyam Afeefa and Nadhiya Hassan, Nimal played the role of Ismail, a friend of a perfidious husband who is unwillingly seduced by woman. The film received mixed reviews from critics, specific appraisal being subjected to its bold and erotic theme. He next appeared as the unsympathetic father in Fathimath Nahula's romantic drama film, Yoosuf which depicts the story of a deaf and mute man (played by Yoosuf Shafeeu) who has been mistreated by a wealthy family, mocking his disability. Featuring an ensemble cast including Yoosuf Shafeeu, Niuma Mohamed, Mohamed Manik, Mohamed Manik, Fauziyya Hassan, Ravee Farooq, Zeenath Abbas and Ahmed Lais Asim, the film is considered to include most prominent faces in a Maldivian film. Initially, Nimal was assigned to direct the film, however Nahula replaced him as the director since his role in the film was expanded and "his sole focus needs to be put into his performance". The film received widespread critical acclaim and was attained a blockbuster status at box office. A total of forty five housefull shows were screened at Olympus Cinema before the film was leaked online, however the producers were able to screen five more shows at the cinema making it one of the Maldivian all-time highest-grossing movies. The film was Maldivian official entry at 2009 SAARC Film Festivals and holds the privilege of being the opening movie of the festival. His performance earned him a Gaumee Film Award nomination for Best Supporting Actor.

Nimal played the deceitful friend in the family drama film E Dharifulhu (2009) which is directed by himself and featuring an ensemble cast including Niuma Mohamed, Yoosuf Shafeeu, Mohamed Manik and Sheela Najeeb. At 1st Maldives Film Awards, Nimal received his first nomination as Best Director for his work in the film. Another release of the year, Loaiybahtakaa (2009), written and directed by Yoosuf Shafeeu stars him as a notable businessman who struggles to welcome his illegitimate son into his family. The romantic drama, co-starring Yoosuf Shafeeu, Fathimath Fareela and Mohamed Faisal, tells the story of unrequited love, and proved to be a commercial success.

Nimal's first release of 2010 was a special appearance in Ali Shifau's family drama Dhin Veynuge Hithaamaigaa where he played and unnamed character who informs Dr. Nahees, played by Mohamed Manik about his wife's maternal death. The film showcases discrimination against the islanders, family revenge and fatherhood responsibilities. Being able to screen fifteen housefull shows of the film, it was declared to be a commercial success. He next starred in the horror film Zalzalaa En'buri Aun (2010) which was edited, written, produced and directed by himself.  It was a spin-off to Aslam Rasheed's horror classic film Zalzalaa (2000) starring, Ibrahim Wisan, Ali Shameel and Niuma Mohamed. The film revolves around a mariage blanc, a murder of husband by his wife with secret lover and avenging of his death from everyone involved in the crime. He played the role Mohamed, father of an avaricious girl who kills her husband with the help of her secret lover. The film received mixed response from critics and it did average business at box office. At the 6th Gaumee Film Awards he received a nomination for Best Director, Best Editing, Best Sound Mixing and Best Art Direction for his work in the film.

Later in 2010, Nimal appeared in a small role in Veeraana as a government official who witness the confess of a murderer. Directed by Yoosuf Shafeeu, it deals with child sexual abuse. The film received mixed to positive reviews from critics; praising the writer and director for touching a condemnatory topic though criticizing its "over-the-top melodrama". Having a strong buzz prior its release, the film was proved to be a commercial success. He next reunited with Niuma Mohamed in his horror film The Three, which received negative reviews from critics and was declared to be a box office disaster. The duo next collaborated in Niuma Mohamed's directorial debut drama film Niuma (2010) alongside an ensemble cast including Mohamed, Yoosuf Shafeeu, Sheela Najeeb, Mohamed Manik, Aminath Rasheedha and Abdulla Muaz. He played the cruel father who sexually abuses his own daughter. He considered his role to be the most inhumane role he has portrayed so far. Upon release, the film was met with widespread critical acclaim specifically complimenting the performance of actors and its dialogues. Being able to screen over thirty housefull shows of the film, it was declared a Mega-Hit at box office, and the highest grossing Maldivian release of the year. The film fetched him a Best Actor nomination at both, 2nd Maldives Film Awards and 6th Gaumee Film Awards.

In 2012, Nimal played a rich father in Ravee Farooq-directed romantic drama film Mihashin Furaana Dhandhen alongside Niuma Mohamed, Mohamed Manik and Ali Seezan. Upon release, the film received mixed response from critics while his performance was recognised positively. Ahmed Nadheem of Haveeru noted the film as "the best Maldivian melodramatic film" he had seen in the past two years, though displeased with its similarities between two Bollywood films. His portrayal of Asim in the film resulted in a Gaumee Film Award nomination for Best Supporting Actor.

In 2013, Nimal featured in Ali Shifau-directed horror film Fathis Handhuvaruge Feshun 3D which serves as a prequel to Fathis Handhuvaru (1997) starring Reeko Moosa Manik and Niuma Mohamed in lead roles. It was based on a story by Ibrahim Waheed, Jinaa: Fathis Handhuvaruge Feshun (2009), which itself is a prequel to the story Fathishandhuvaru (1996) written by himself which was later adapted to a film by same name in 1997. The film was marketed as being the first 3D release for a Maldivian film and the first release derived from spin-off. He played the role of Naseem, a spell maker. Upon release the film received generally negative reviews from critics. Ahmed Nadheem from Haveeru Daily wrote: "Nimal stands on top of the supporting cast playing a hungry man doing spells".

Mohamed Aboobakuru-directed Randhari was Nimal's only release of 2015. His portrayal of the character Razzaq, a ruthless father, along with the film received negative reviews from critics and did below average business at the box office. The following year, he directed an starred in the horror film E Re'ah Fahu (2016). Upon release, the film received negative response from critics and was declared a flop. His next appearance was Hussain Munawwar's Neyngi Yaaru Vakivee alongside Ahmed Azmeel and Aminath Rishfa. Critics panned the film and labelled his performance as "boring" while criticising the character development. Despite the negative reviews, the film did an average business at the end of its run.

Personal life
Nimal met actress Fathimath Rameeza during the filming of Maqsadhu (1987) although their romantic relationship started while shooting for the film Shakku (1988).

Filmography

Feature film

Television

Short film

Other work

Discography

Accolades

References 

Living people
Maldivian male film actors
Maldivian film directors
21st-century Maldivian male actors
1963 births